This page lists all described species of the spider family Anamidae accepted by the World Spider Catalog :

Aname

Aname L. Koch, 1873
 A. aragog Harvey, Framenau, Wojcieszek, Rix & Harvey, 2012 — Australia (Western Australia)
 A. atra (Strand, 1913) — Australia (South Australia)
 A. aurea Rainbow & Pulleine, 1918 — Australia (New South Wales)
 A. baileyorum Castalanelli, Framenau, Huey, Hillyer & Harvey, 2020 — Australia (Western Australia)
 A. barrema Raven, 1985 — Australia (Queensland)
 A. blackdownensis Raven, 1985 — Australia (Queensland)
 A. camara Raven, 1985 — Australia (Queensland)
 A. carina Raven, 1985 — Australia (Queensland)
 A. coenosa Rainbow & Pulleine, 1918 — Australia (South Australia)
 A. collinsorum Raven, 1985 — Australia (Queensland)
 A. comosa Rainbow & Pulleine, 1918 — Australia (South Australia)
 A. distincta (Rainbow, 1914) — Australia (Queensland)
 A. diversicolor (Hogg, 1902) — Australia (Queensland)
 A. elegans (Harvey, Wilson & Rix, 2022) — Australia (South Australia)
 A. ellenae Harvey, Framenau, Wojcieszek, Rix & Harvey, 2012 — Australia (Western Australia)
 A. exulans Harvey & Huey, 2020 — Australia (Western Australia)
 A. frostorum Castalanelli, Framenau, Huey, Hillyer & Harvey, 2020 — Australia (Western Australia)
 A. fuscocincta Rainbow & Pulleine, 1918 — Australia (Western Australia)
 A. grandis Rainbow & Pulleine, 1918 — Australia (South Australia)
 A. grothi Castalanelli, Framenau, Huey, Hillyer & Harvey, 2020 — Australia (Western Australia)
 A. hirsuta Rainbow & Pulleine, 1918 — Australia (South Australia)
 A. humptydoo Raven, 1985 — Australia (Northern Territory)
 A. inimica Raven, 1985 — Australia (Queensland, New South Wales)
 A. kirrama Raven, 1984 — Australia (Queensland)
 A. lillianae Harvey & Huey, 2020 — Australia (Western Australia)
 A. longitheca Raven, 1985 — Australia (Queensland)
 A. lorica Castalanelli, Framenau, Huey, Hillyer & Harvey, 2020 — Australia (Western Australia)
 A. maculata (Rainbow & Pulleine, 1918) — Australia (Western Australia)
 A. mainae Raven, 2000 — Australia (South Australia)
 A. marae Harvey, Framenau, Wojcieszek, Rix & Harvey, 2012 — Australia (Western Australia)
 A. mcalpinei Castalanelli, Framenau, Huey, Hillyer & Harvey, 2020 — Australia (Western Australia)
 A. mccleeryorum Harvey & Huey, 2020 — Australia (Western Australia)
 A. mellosa Harvey, Framenau, Wojcieszek, Rix & Harvey, 2012 — Australia (Western Australia)
 A. munyardae Castalanelli, Framenau, Huey, Hillyer & Harvey, 2020 — Australia (Western Australia)
 A. nitidimarina Castalanelli, Framenau, Huey, Hillyer & Harvey, 2020 — Australia (Western Australia)
 A. pallida L. Koch, 1873 (type) — Australia (Queensland)
 A. phillipae Harvey & Huey, 2020 — Australia (Western Australia)
 A. platypus (L. Koch, 1875) — Australia
 A. pulchella (Harvey, Wilson & Rix, 2022) — Australia (Western Australia)
 A. robertsorum Raven, 1985 — Australia (Queensland)
 A. simoneae Harvey & Huey, 2020 — Australia (Western Australia)
 A. sinuata Castalanelli, Framenau, Huey, Hillyer & Harvey, 2020 — Australia (Western Australia)
 A. tasmanica Hogg, 1902 — Australia (Tasmania)
 A. tigrina Raven, 1985 — Australia (Queensland)
 A. vernonorum Castalanelli, Framenau, Huey, Hillyer & Harvey, 2020 — Australia (Western Australia)
 A. warialda Raven, 1985 — Australia (Queensland, New South Wales)
 A. watsoni Castalanelli, Framenau, Huey, Hillyer & Harvey, 2020 — Australia (Western Australia)
 A. whitei Castalanelli, Framenau, Huey, Hillyer & Harvey, 2020 — Australia (Western Australia)

Chenistonia

Chenistonia Hogg, 1901
 C. boranup Main, 2012 — Australia (Western Australia)
 C. caeruleomontana (Raven, 1984) — Australia (New South Wales)
 C. earthwatchorum (Raven, 1984) — Australia (Queensland)
 C. hickmani (Raven, 1984) — Australia (New South Wales)
 C. maculata Hogg, 1901 (type) — Australia (Victoria)
 C. montana (Raven, 1984) — Australia (New South Wales)
 C. trevallynia Hickman, 1926 — Australia (Tasmania)
 C. tropica (Raven, 1984) — Australia (Queensland)

Hesperonatalius

Hesperonatalius Castalanelli, Huey, Hillyer & Harvey, 2017
 H. harrietae Castalanelli, Huey, Hillyer & Harvey, 2017 — Australia (Western)
 H. langlandsi Castalanelli, Huey, Hillyer & Harvey, 2017 — Australia (Western)
 H. maxwelli Castalanelli, Huey, Hillyer & Harvey, 2017 (type) — Australia (Western)

Kwonkan

Kwonkan Main, 1983
 K. anatolion Main, 1983 — Australia (South Australia)
 K. currycomboides (Main, 1986) — Australia (Western Australia)
 K. eboracum Main, 1983 — Australia (Western Australia)
 K. goongarriensis Main, 1983 — Australia (Western Australia)
 K. linnaei (Main, 2008) — Australia (Western Australia)
 K. moriartii Main, 1983 — Australia (Western Australia)
 K. silvestris Main, 1983 — Australia (Western Australia)
 K. turrigera (Main, 1994) — Australia (Western Australia, South Australia)
 K. wonganensis (Main, 1977) (type) — Australia (Western Australia)

Namea

Namea Raven, 1984
 N. brisbanensis Raven, 1984 — Australia (Queensland)
 N. bunya Raven, 1984 — Australia (Queensland)
 N. calcaria Raven, 1984 — Australia (Queensland)
 N. callemonda Raven, 1984 — Australia (Queensland)
 N. capricornia Raven, 1984 (type) — Australia (Queensland)
 N. cucurbita Raven, 1984 — Australia (Queensland)
 N. dahmsi Raven, 1984 — Australia (Queensland)
 N. dicalcaria Raven, 1984 — Australia (New South Wales)
 N. excavans Raven, 1984 — Australia (Queensland)
 N. flavomaculata (Rainbow & Pulleine, 1918) — Australia (Queensland)
 N. gloriosa Rix, Wilson & Harvey, 2020 — Australia (Queensland)
 N. gowardae Rix, Wilson & Harvey, 2020 — Australia (Queensland)
 N. jimna Raven, 1984 — Australia (Queensland)
 N. nebo Rix, Wilson & Harvey, 2020 — Australia (Queensland)
 N. nebulosa Raven, 1984 — Australia (Queensland)
 N. nigritarsus Rix, Wilson & Harvey, 2020 — Australia (Queensland)
 N. olympus Raven, 1984 — Australia (Queensland)
 N. salanitri Raven, 1984 — Australia (Queensland, New South Wales)
 N. saundersi Raven, 1984 — Australia (Queensland)

Proshermacha

Proshermacha Simon, 1908
 P. armigera (Rainbow & Pulleine, 1918) — Australia (Western Australia)
 P. auropilosa (Rainbow & Pulleine, 1918) — Australia
 P. cuspidata (Main, 1954) — Australia (Western Australia)
 P. intricata (Rainbow & Pulleine, 1918) — Australia
 P. maculata (Rainbow & Pulleine, 1918) — Australia
 P. subarmata Simon, 1908 (type) — Australia
 P. tepperi (Hogg, 1902) — Southern Australia
 P. tigrina Simon, 1908 — Australia
 P. villosa (Rainbow & Pulleine, 1918) — Australia (Western Australia)

Swolnpes

Swolnpes Main & Framenau, 2009
 S. darwini Main & Framenau, 2009 (type) — Australia (Western Australia)
 S. morganensis Main & Framenau, 2009 — Australia (Western Australia)

Teyl

Teyl Main, 1975
 T. damsonoides (Main, 1983) — Australia (Western Australia)
 T. harveyi Main, 2004 — Australia (Victoria)
 T. heuretes Huey, Rix, Wilson, Hillyer & Harvey, 2019 — Australia (Western Australia)
 T. luculentus Main, 1975 (type) — Australia (Western Australia)
 T. vancouveri (Main, 1985) — Australia (Western Australia)
 T. walkeri Main, 2004 — Australia (Victoria)
 T. yeni Main, 2004 — Australia (Victoria)

Teyloides

Teyloides Main, 1985
 T. bakeri Main, 1985 (type) — Australia (South Australia)

Troglodiplura

Troglodiplura Main, 1969
 T. beirutpakbarai Harvey & Rix, 2020 — Australia (South Australia)
 T. challeni Harvey & Rix, 2020 — Australia (Western Australia)
 T. harrisi Harvey & Rix, 2020 — Australia (Western Australia)
 T. lowryi Main, 1969 (type) — Australia (Western Australia)
 T. samankunani Harvey & Rix, 2020 — Australia (Western Australia)

References

Anamidae